Acts 20 is the twentieth chapter of the Acts of the Apostles in the Christian New Testament of the Bible. It records the third missionary journey of Paul the Apostle. The book containing this chapter is anonymous, but early Christian tradition uniformly affirmed that Luke the Evangelist composed this book as well as the Gospel of Luke.

Text
Originally written in Koine Greek, this chapter is divided into 38 verses.

Textual witnesses
Some early manuscripts containing the text of this chapter are:

In Koine Greek
 Codex Vaticanus (AD 325–350)
 Codex Sinaiticus (330–360)
 Codex Bezae (~400)
 Codex Alexandrinus (400–440)
 Codex Ephraemi Rescriptus (~450; extant verses 11–38)
 Codex Laudianus (~550)

In Latin
 Codex Laudianus (~550)

Locations

This chapter mentions the following places (in order of appearance):
 Macedonia
 Greece
 Syria
 Berea
 Asia (Roman province)
 Thessalonica
 Derbe
 Philippi
 Troas
 Assos
 Mitylene
 Chios
 Samos
 Trogyllium
 Miletus
 Ephesus
 Jerusalem

Journey to Troas via Macedonia (20:1–6)
(probably) ), Tychicus, Aristarchus and Gaius (cf.).

Verse 4
And there accompanied him into Asia Sopater of Berea; and of the Thessalonians, Aristarchus and Secundus; and Gaius of Derbe, and Timotheus; and of Asia, Tychicus and Trophimus.
"Sopater" (Sṓpatros, meaning "saviour of his father") was the son of Pyrhus, a man from the city of Berea
"Aristarchus": One of Paul's travel companions, a Macedonian from Thessalonica who is known from some references in the Acts of the Apostles (19:29; 20:4; 27:2) and Colossians 4:10.
"Timotheus" or "Timothy" (NKJV).
"Tychicus": traveled with Paul on his third missionary journey (Titus 3:12).
Tychicus and Trophimus are called Asianoi ("of Asia"), that is, natives of the Roman province of Asia. Making it still more definite, Trophimus is also termed an "Ephesian" and a "Gentile/Greek" in Acts 21.

In Troas (20:7–12)
The believers in Troas (cf. ) had a "meeting" on the first day of the week (verse 7; cf. ), which started on Saturday night (at that time, Sunday was a working day, so the practice was to gather on Saturday night or early on Sunday morning as noted by Pliny, Ep. 10.96.7), perhaps after work for some people, including Eutychus, which is a common slave name. It comprised a long teaching session by Paul (verse 7), 'breaking of bread' and a communal meal (verse 11), then finished at dawn.

Verse 9

 And in a window sat a certain young man named Eutychus, who was sinking into a deep sleep. He was overcome by sleep; and as Paul continued speaking, he fell down from the third story and was taken up dead.
Eutychus was a young man of (Alexandria) Troas tended to by St. Paul. The name Eutychus means "fortunate". Eutychus fell asleep due to the long nature of the discourse Paul was giving and fell from his seat out of a three-story window. Paul's immediate action to resurrect Euthycus (verse 10) recalls the miracles of Elijah and Elisha (1 Kings 17:21–22; 2 Kings 4:34–35). The term "dead" (Greek: nekros) is used to emphasize that this is to be seen as a real miracle (verse 10).
"Third story": this indicates a 'working-class insula or apartment block', not the atrium of a villa or town house.

Verse 10

 But Paul went down, fell on him, and embracing him said, "Do not trouble yourselves, for his life is in him."
After Eutychus fell down to his death, Paul then picked him up, insisting that he was not dead, and carried him back upstairs; those gathered then had a meal and a long conversation which lasted until dawn. After Paul left, Eutychus was found to be alive. It is unclear whether the story intends to relate that Eutychus was killed by the fall and Paul raised him, or whether he simply seemed to be dead, with Paul ensuring that he is still alive.

Verse 12
 And they brought the young man in alive, and they were not a little comforted.

Journey from Troas to Miletus (20:13–17)

Paul's journey through the northern Aegean Sea is detailed in verses 13 to 16. The text states that Paul, having left Philiipi after the Days of Unleavened Bread, had a desire urgently to travel to Jerusalem and needed to be there by the Day of Pentecost, even choosing to avoid returning to Ephesus and being delayed there. As there are fifty days from the Feast of Unleavened Bread (Passover) to Pentecost, and five days were taken on travel from Philippi to Troas and seven days spent waiting in Troas, Paul and his party had around 38 days available for travel to Jerusalem.

Paul appears to have made the arrangements to charter a ship, but Luke and his companions began the journey from Troas and sailed around Cape Baba to Assos. Paul travelled overland from Troas to Assos and embarked there. The ship sailed southwards to Lesbos, calling at Mitylene, then passed Chios and arrived at Samos, staying at Trogyllium. They passed Ephesus and came into port at Miletus, calling for the elders of the church in Ephesus to travel to Miletus for a meeting. The elders of the church (tous presbyterous tes ekklesias) were also referred to as overseers (episkopous) in verse 28.

Miletus is about 40 miles south of Ephesus. The Jamieson-Fausset-Brown Bible Commentary noted that in view of Paul's haste, more time might have been lost in calling for the elders to come from Ephesus than would have been lost if Paul had actually gone to Ephesus himself, but surmised that either his decision was made because of 'unfavorable winds and stormy weather [which] had overtaken them' or 'he was unwilling to run the risk of detention at Ephesus by the state of the church and other causes'.

Paul's speech to the Ephesian elders (20:18–38) 
This section records the only direct speech of Paul to Christian believers in the book of Acts, thus the only passage which strictly parallels the epistles (cf. Philippians 3; 2 Timothy 3–4; Romans 15, and the autobiographical sections in 2 Corinthians 10-12.

Verse 24
 [Paul said:] "But none of these things move me; nor do I count my life dear to myself, so that I may finish my race with joy, and the ministry which I received from the Lord Jesus, to testify to the gospel of the grace of God."

Verse 28
 [Paul said:] “Take heed therefore unto yourselves, and to all the flock, over the which the Holy Ghost hath made you overseers, to feed the church of God, which he hath purchased with his own blood.”
 "Take heed...unto yourselves": translated from the Greek phrase), which is peculiar to Luke's writings.
Both "elders" and "bishops" have been originally and apostolically synonymous, that the distinction between these offices cannot be certainly traced until the second century, nor was it established until late in that century.
A 'pastor' is 'to feed the flock' (of Christ cf. ; ;). Peter applies the titles of "Shepherd and Bishop of souls" to the Lord Jesus. Paul does not use the metaphor elsewhere, except indirectly, and in a different aspect.
"Which he hath purchased": translated from the Greek phrase , hēn periepoiēsato, "which He has acquired" for His possession (Ephesians 1:14; Titus 2:14; 1 Peter 2:9) by His own blood (cf. 1 Corinthians 6; 1 Corinthians 7; ; .
 "Church of God": translated from the Greek phrase ,  tou Theou. Textus Receptus has , tou Theou, whereas many uncials have , "of [the] Lord" but the phrase  occurs nowhere else in Paul's writings, while the phrase  occurs ten times in Pauline epistles. Both the Codex Vaticanus (B; 03) and the Codex Sinaiticus (01), regarded as two oldest manuscripts, have , as well as the Latin Vulgate and the Syriac versions. The early Church Fathers  Ignatius (in his Epistle to the Ephesians) and Tertullian use the phrase, "the blood of God," which seems to have been derived from this passage.
This verse was engraved on a papal tiara which Napoleon gave to Pope Pius VII.

Verse 35
 [Paul said:] "I have shown you in every way, by laboring like this, that you must support the weak. And remember the words of the Lord Jesus, that He said, 'It is more blessed to give than to receive.'"

This verse is unusual in that it records a saying of Jesus that did not come to be recorded in any of the gospels. In his homily on the Acts of the Apostles, John Chrysostom says, "And where said He this? Perhaps the Apostles delivered it by unwritten tradition; or else it is plain from (recorded sayings, from) which one could infer it." A similar saying is also found in the deuterocanonical book of Tobit.

See also 

 Related Bible parts: Luke 12, Luke 17, Luke 21; John 10, John 21; 1 Corinthians 6, 1 Corinthians 7, 1 Corinthians 9; Ephesians 1; 1 Timothy 3, 1 Timothy 4, 1 Timothy 6; Titus; Hebrews 13; 1 Peter 1, 1 Peter 2, 1 Peter 5

Notes

References

Sources

External links
 King James Bible - Wikisource
English Translation with Parallel Latin Vulgate
Online Bible at GospelHall.org (ESV, KJV, Darby, American Standard Version, Bible in Basic English)
Multiple bible versions at Bible Gateway (NKJV, NIV, NRSV etc.)

 
20